Zygfryd Friedek (born 19 October 1944) is a former international speedway rider from Poland.

Speedway career 
Friedek reached the final of the Speedway World Championship in the 1970 Individual Speedway World Championship.

World final appearances

Individual World Championship
 1970 –  Wrocław, Olympic Stadium – 15th – 2pts

References 

1944 births
Polish speedway riders
Living people